Manuel Nhanga Kambala (born 29 July 1995) is a Mozambican footballer who plays as a midfielder for Baroka FC. They gave him the nickname "Lord" in respect with what he did in 2019/20 season in PSL (scoring equalising goal).

References: South African football association. 

1991 births
Living people
Mozambican footballers
Mozambique international footballers
UD Songo players
Baroka F.C. players
Association football midfielders
Mozambican expatriate footballers
Expatriate soccer players in South Africa
Mozambican expatriate sportspeople in South Africa

On the 5th of September, South African football fans celebrate an unofficial Lord Manuel Kambala day to commemorate his heroic contributions and history making.